Meduru is a village in Krishna district of the Indian state of Andhra Pradesh. It is located in Pamidimukkala mandal of Vuyyuru revenue division.

An inscription states that in 1516 a battle took place between Srikrishna Devaraya and some enemy whose name is obliterated, in which Srikrishna Devaraya was victorious.  Source - A forgotten empire by Robert Sewell

References 

Villages in Krishna district
Villages in Andhra Pradesh Capital Region